Iftekhar Uddin Chowdhury (born 1 July 1955) is a Bangladeshi academic. He served as the 17th vice-chancellor of the University of Chittagong.

Education and career
Chowdhury earned his bachelor's and master's from the University of Chittagong. He completed his Ph.D. from the University of Tsukuba in 1988.

Chowdhury is a professor of sociology at the University of Chittagong. He joined the university in 1982. He served as the pro-vice-chancellor of the university during 2013–15. He served as a visiting professor of the University of Tsukuba, Osaka University and University of Glasgow.

Books 
 Chowdhury, Iftekhar Uddin, ed. (1992). [Current Social Thoughts: Bangladesh Perspective] (in Bengali). Center for Social Research.

References 

Living people
1955 births
University of Chittagong alumni
Academic staff of the University of Chittagong
Vice-Chancellors of the University of Chittagong
University of Tsukuba alumni